The Bangalore Warhawks are a professional American football team based in Bangalore, India. The Warhawks are one of the first eight franchises of the Elite Football League of India (EFLI) and compete in its inaugural season in 2012 as a member of the West Division, where they finished as semi-finalists.

The team was originally slated to play in Bhubaneshwar, but officials have since moved the franchise. The team is owned by Buffalo Bills player Mario Williams.

References

Elite Football League of India
American football teams in India
American football teams established in 2011
Sport in Bangalore
2011 establishments in Karnataka